Yun Myeong (?-?) was a scholar-official of the Joseon Dynasty Korea in the 15th century.

He was also diplomat and ambassador, representing Joseon interests in a diplomatic mission to the Ashikaga shogunate in Japan.

1406 mission to Japan
King Taejong dispatched a diplomatic mission to Japan in 1406. This delegation to court of Ashikaga Yoshimochi was led by Yun Myeong. The purpose of this diplomatic embassy was to respond to a message sent to the Joseon court by the Japanese shogun.

The Japanese hosts may have construed this mission as tending to confirm a Japanocentric world order.  Yun Myeong's actions were more narrowly focused in negotiating protocols for Joseon-Japan diplomatic relations.

See also
 Joseon diplomacy
 Joseon missions to Japan
 Joseon tongsinsa

Notes

References

 Daehwan, Noh.  "The Eclectic Development of Neo-Confucianism and Statecraft from the 18th to the 19th Century," Korea Journal (Winter 2003).
 Kang, Etsuko Hae-jin. (1997). Diplomacy and Ideology in Japanese-Korean Relations: from the Fifteenth to the Eighteenth Century. Basingstoke, Hampshire; Macmillan. ;

External links
 Joseon Tongsinsa Cultural Exchange Association ; 

Year of birth unknown
Year of death unknown
15th-century Korean people
Korean diplomats